The 1960–61 Detroit Red Wings season saw the Red Wings finish in fourth place in the National Hockey League (NHL) with a record of 25 wins, 29 losses, and 16 ties for 66 points. They defeated the Toronto Maple Leafs in six games in the Semi-finals before losing the Stanley Cup Finals in six games to the Chicago Black Hawks.

Offseason

Regular season

Final standings

Record vs. opponents

Schedule and results

Player statistics

Regular season
Scoring

Goaltending

Playoffs
Scoring

Goaltending

Note: GP = Games played; G = Goals; A = Assists; Pts = Points; +/- = Plus-minus PIM = Penalty minutes; PPG = Power-play goals; SHG = Short-handed goals; GWG = Game-winning goals;
      MIN = Minutes played; W = Wins; L = Losses; T = Ties; GA = Goals against; GAA = Goals-against average;  SO = Shutouts;

Playoffs

Awards and honors

References
 Red Wings on Hockey Database

Detroit
Detroit
Detroit Red Wings seasons
Detroit Red Wings
Detroit Red Wings